The two blossomcrowns comprise the genus Anthocephala. They were formerly considered conspecific. The SACC accepted both as distinct species in 2015. 

The two species are: 
 Santa Marta blossomcrown (Anthocephala floriceps)
 Tolima blossomcrown (Anthocephala berlepschi)

References

 

Blossomcrowns